Sunday Ogochukwu Oliseh (born 14 September 1974) is a Nigerian football manager and former player. In his active playing career he played as a defensive midfielder. Physical yet technically gifted, he played for top European clubs including Ajax, Borussia Dortmund and Juventus. He is widely regarded as one of the best African midfielders of all time.

Playing career
Oliseh played 63 international matches and scored three goals for Nigeria, and played at the Football World Cups of 1994 and 1998. Oliseh also participated in the Olympic gold medal winning team of 1996.

Oliseh was voted Africa's third best footballer in 1998 by CAF.

He is mostly remembered for scoring the winning goal in the group stage match against Spain in the 1998 World Cup, as Nigeria prevailed 3–2. A throw-in deep in the Spanish half was headed clear by Fernando Hierro – Oliseh ran and fired an explosive shot from 25 yards and took Spanish goalkeeper Andoni Zubizarreta completely by surprise. Despite captaining Nigeria during the 2002 African Cup of Nations, Oliseh was omitted from his country's World Cup squad later that year for disciplinary reasons. After missing out on World Cup selection, Oliseh retired from international football in June 2002 for having led the team as they demanded unpaid allowances and dues owed to be paid.

In March 2004, Oliseh was sacked by Borussia Dortmund after head butting teammate Vahid Hashemian while on loan at VfL Bochum allegedly over racial remarks.

In January 2006, at the age of 31, Oliseh retired from professional football after playing a half season for Belgian First Division A top club K.R.C. Genk.

Managerial career
Oliseh started his coaching career in Belgium with youth teams in the Belgian 3rd Division Verviers, notably the Under 19 team. Graduated to the first team as chief coach season 2008–09 Verviers. During the 2014–15 season, he was appointed as the Chief Coach and Club Manager of RCS VISE Belgium 3rd Division.

In 2015–16, was appointed by the Nigerian Football Federation (NFF) the National Team Chief Coach of Nigeria (Super Eagles of Nigeria) where he made an impressive statistic of; 14 Games (Only 2 losses) 19 Goals scored, 6 conceded.

He qualified Nigeria to the CHAN tournament in Rwanda, qualified Nigeria to the Group phase of the 2018 world cup Qualifiers and on his first game as Chief Coach of Nigeria in an AFCON qualifier managed a draw in Tanzania.
He resigned as Nigeria's national coach at about 2:28am on 26 February 2016 exactly a month to the team's encounter with the Pharaohs of Egypt in the AFCON qualifiers. He was barely 8 months into his stay as manager due to contract violations, lack of support, unpaid wages and benefits to his players, Asst. Coaches and himself.
On 27 December 2016, it was announced that Oliseh had been appointed as the new manager of Fortuna Sittard. He was fired on 14 February 2018, and claimed the reason he was fired was because he refused to participate in illegal activities at the club.

After two years without a club, in March 2020, Oliseh stated that he had turned down "two jobs from Belgian clubs", but that he waited for the right offer.

In June 2022, he was appointed as the new head coach of German club SV 19 Straelen. In August 2022, after just two months in charge, he quit his position after the team suffered five losses in five games.

Style of play
Although Oliseh essentially played as a defensive midfielder throughout his career, Jonathan Wilson noted in a 2013 article for The Guardian that he was an early example of a more creative interpreter of this role, who focussed more on ball retention and passing rather than solely looking to win back possession.

Personal life
His younger brothers, Azubuike and Egutu, are also professional footballers; another brother is Churchill Oliseh and his nephew is Sekou Oliseh.

Career statistics

Club

International

Honours
Ajax
 Eredivisie: 1997–98
 KNVB Cup: 1997–98, 1998–99

Juventus
 UEFA Intertoto Cup: 1999

Borussia Dortmund
 Bundesliga: 2001–02
 UEFA Cup runner-up: 2001–02

Nigeria U23
 Olympic Gold Medal: 1996

Nigeria
 African Cup of Nations: 1994
 Afro-Asian Cup of Nations: 1995

References

External links
 

1974 births
Living people
Nigerian emigrants to Belgium
Sportspeople from Delta State
Nigerian footballers
Association football defenders
Nigeria international footballers
Bundesliga players
Eredivisie players
Serie A players
Belgian Pro League players
RFC Liège players
A.C. Reggiana 1919 players
1. FC Köln players
AFC Ajax players
Juventus F.C. players
Borussia Dortmund players
VfL Bochum players
K.R.C. Genk players
Africa Cup of Nations-winning players
1994 FIFA World Cup players
1998 FIFA World Cup players
1995 King Fahd Cup players
1994 African Cup of Nations players
2000 African Cup of Nations players
2002 African Cup of Nations players
Olympic medalists in football
Medalists at the 1996 Summer Olympics
Olympic footballers of Nigeria
Olympic gold medalists for Nigeria
Footballers at the 1996 Summer Olympics
Nigerian football managers
Nigeria national football team managers
Fortuna Sittard managers
R.C.S. Verviétois managers
Nigerian expatriate footballers
Nigerian expatriate sportspeople in Belgium
Expatriate footballers in Belgium
Nigerian expatriate sportspeople in Italy
Expatriate footballers in Italy
Nigerian expatriate sportspeople in Germany
Expatriate footballers in Germany
Nigerian expatriate sportspeople in the Netherlands
Expatriate footballers in the Netherlands